is a Japanese boy band formed in June 2016. The group consists of six members: Nanamori, Jel, Satomi, Colon, Rinu, and Root. Each member is represented by an illustrated character when appearing in media.

History 
Strawberry Prince was founded by Nanamori, the group's leader, on June 4, 2016. Nanamori had gained popularity on Nico Nico Douga by uploading song covers, and he contacted other popular users to form a group. The members use stage names and illustrated avatars to represent themselves, never revealing their real names and never showing their real faces except at live performances and meet-and-greets. Nanamori thought that it was too dangerous to post his face on the internet when he first started posting videos, and he decided to keep the gimmick after forming the group. In addition to music, the members also upload talkshows, video game playthroughs, and humorous videos to their YouTube channel.

While the group would upload their original music to their official YouTube channel for the first few years, Strawberry Prince's first commercial release would not be until 2019, with the release of the mini-album Strawberry Start in March 2019. Strawberry Start sold over 80,000 copies in its debut week, and achieved the second place spot on the Oricon weekly album ranking. Four months later, they released their first full album, Strawberry Love! This time, the group would achieve the first place spot on the Oricon weekly album ranking, with the album selling 72,000 copies on its first day and over 107,000 copies in its first week. They would rank first again with their third full album, Strawberry Prince, which exceeded 230,000 sales in its first week and would also be the group's first album to receive a Platinum certification from the Recording Industry Association of Japan in November 2020. The second full album, Strawberry Next!, would also receive a Platinum certification in January 2021. The group's first extended play, Are You Ready?, released on August 1, 2022. Following the pause in activities from Nanamori and Jel, the remaining four members would release Here We Go!! on December 21, 2022, which sold 165,000 copies in its first week and achieved the number one spot on the Oricon weekly album ranking.

Strawberry Prince's music has been featured in other media, particularly in the Yo-kai Watch franchise. The songs "Gingira ginga" and "Dai uchū Rendezvous" were used as ending themes for the video game Yo-kai Watch Jam: Yo-kai Academy Y – Waiwai Gakuen Seikatsu and as opening themes for the anime Yo-kai Watch Jam – Yo-kai Academy Y: Close Encounters of the N Kind, and the song "Yōkai Watch" was used as the opening theme for the video game Yo-kai Watch 4++. The song "Start" was also used as the opening theme for the second season of the anime Cardfight!! Vanguard overDress, and the song "Accelerate" was used as the opening theme for the second season of Cardfight!! Vanguard will+Dress. In February 2022, the members appeared in an anime-style television commercial for Meiji Seika.

In March 2022, the YouTuber Korekore claimed that Nanamori had a fiancée and child, and accused him of infidelity. STPR Inc., the parent company of the group's record label, put out a statement a few days later confirming that the allegations were true and stating that Nanamori would be going on hiatus. A live concert that had been scheduled for May 2022 was confirmed to be going ahead with only the other five members. In August 2022, Jel announced that he would be going on hiatus following a concert later that month due to depression. On December 14, 2022, Nanamori stated that he would be resuming his activities solo, but that he would not be rejoining Strawberry Prince for the time being.

Members

Current members

Active

Inactive

Former members

Discography

Albums

Mini albums

Extended plays

Singles

Filmography

Television

Radio shows

Bibliography

Awards and nominations

References

External links 

 

Musical groups established in 2016
Japanese musical groups
Utaite
2016 establishments in Japan